The Sorrento Peninsula or Sorrentine Peninsula is a peninsula located in southern Italy which separates the Gulf of Naples to the north from the Gulf of Salerno to the south.

Geography

Overview
The peninsula is named after its main town, Sorrento, which is located on the north (Gulf of Naples) coast. The Amalfi Coast is located on the southern side. The Lattari Mountains form the geographical backbone of the peninsula. The island of Capri lies off the western tip of the peninsula in the Tyrrhenian Sea. The whole area is an important tourist destination.

Municipalities
9 comunes of the peninsula are in the territory of the province of Naples and 12 comunes are in the province of Salerno.

Transportation

Airports

The nearest airports are:
 Naples International (NAP)
 Salerno Costa d'Amalfi (QSR)

See also

Amalfi Coast
Capri
Gulf of Naples
Gulf of Salerno
Monti Lattari
Punta Campanella Lighthouse
Sant'Agata sui Due Golfi
Sirenuse
Southern Italy

References

External links

Peninsulas of Italy
Landforms of Campania
Sorrento
Landforms of the Tyrrhenian Sea
Geography of the Metropolitan City of Naples
Geographical, historical and cultural regions of Italy